Sub is the debut album by Swiss industrial metal band Apollyon Sun, released in 2000 on Mayan Records.

The band started working on a full album, titled Sub, at London's Trident Studios in 1998, with producer Roli Mosimann (Björk, Marilyn Manson, Faith No More), who had also produced the 1990 Celtic Frost album Vanity/Nemesis. Further recording and mixing sessions took place at EastSide Sound in Manhattan, Nomis Studios in London, and at various studio locations in Switzerland. Sub features prominent final mixes by Mosimann, John Fryer (HIM, Nine Inch Nails), and Apollyon Sun themselves. Sub was released globally through Mayan Records in late summer 2000, after two years of studio work.

"Human III" is the continuation of a song developed by Tom Gabriel Fischer, following on from "Human (Intro)" from Celtic Frost's Morbid Tales (1984) and "Human II" from Celtic Frost's Cold Lake (1988). "Messiah (Second Coming)" is a remake of the Hellhammer song "Messiah", Hellhammer being one of Fischer's former bands. "Reefer Boy" and "Concrete Satan" both appeared on the God Leaves (And Dies) EP, however they were completely re-recorded for Sub. There are several unreleased songs from these sessions including "Cradle", a re-recorded version of "God Leaves" and two further instrumentals.

Track listing
"Dweller" (Subhuman Remix) – 5:15	
"Reefer Boy" (John Fryer Remix) – 4:55	
"Feeder" – 4:20	
"Messiah (Second Coming)" – 4:10	
"Naked Underground" – 5:01	
"Slender" – 5:43	
"Human III" – 4:33	
"R.U.M." – 0:56	
"Mother Misplaced" – 5:37	
"Concrete Satan" – 3:58
"The End: Leviathan" – 1:00 (hidden track)

Personnel
Apollyon Sun
Tom Gabriel Fischer – vocals, guitars
Erol Unala – guitars, grooves
Donovan John Szypura – programming
Danny Zingg – bass
Marky Edelmann – drums, synthesizer

Additional musicians
Michelle Amar – vocals on "Slender" and "Human III"
Kat – vocals on "Messiah (Second Coming)"
Xavier Russell – vocals on "R.U.M."
Gary Townsley – vocal effect on "Messiah (Second Coming)"
Ron Marks – guitar on "Naked Underground"
Kurt Unala – acoustic bass on "Slender"
Roger Muller – programming
Roli Mosimann – additional programming

Production
Apollyon Sun – producers, mixing on "Dweller"
Roli Mosimann – producer, mixing
Richard Hilton – engineer
John Fryer – mixing on "Reefer Boy"
Gary Townsley, Laura Whittaker – mixing assistants
Simon Heyworth – mastering at Chop 'Em Out, London

References

Apollyon Sun albums
2000 debut albums
Albums produced by Roli Mosimann